The Wildgärst is a mountain of the Bernese Alps, overlooking Lake Brienz in the Bernese Oberland. It lies north of the Schwarzhorn, on the range between Lake Brienz and the Grosse Scheidegg.

References

External links
 Wildgärst on Hikr

Mountains of the Alps
Mountains of Switzerland
Mountains of the canton of Bern
Two-thousanders of Switzerland